Rassam, also Al Rassam (with the Arabic definite article Al), is a common surname particularly in Arabic (written رسّام) meaning painter or draftsman. Notable people with the surname include:

Ibn Rassam, Egyptian Muslim alchemist and tile-maker and mosaic designer, who flourished during the Mamluk Bahri dynasty
Abdul Qadir Al Rassam (1882–1952), Iraqi painter 
Hormuzd Rassam (1826–1910), native Assyrian and Christian Assyriologist
Hussam Al Rassam, Iraqi singer 
Jean-Pierre Rassam, French Lebanese film producer
Julien Rassam, French Lebanese actor

See also
Rasam, a South Indian soup